Newbridge is a small rural village located in County Galway in Ireland. It is located on a National secondary road, the N63 Galway City - Longford and is 55 km from Galway City and 25 km from Roscommon Town. 

The village has had various names in Irish such as "An Droichead Nua" as used officially, but there are also "Gort an Iomaire" and "Cruffan". The English name Newbridge comes from the village's bridge over the Shiven River.

See also
 List of towns and villages in Ireland

Towns and villages in County Galway
Articles on towns and villages in Ireland possibly missing Irish place names